Coed y Rhygen National Nature Reserve is located on the western shore of Llyn Trawsfynydd in Gwynedd, North Wales. As an example of Atlantic Rainforest, it is very wet and the are many different examples of mosses and liverworts that cover the ground and the trees. The reserve covers 2.78 hectares, is privately owned and is not open to the public.

References 

National nature reserves in Wales
Nature reserves in Gwynedd